Bolshaya Tavolzhanka is a rural locality (a khutor) in Krasnooktyabrskoye Rural Settlement, Alexeyevsky District, Volgograd Oblast, Russia. The population was 112 as of 2010.

Geography 
Bolshaya Tavolzhanka is located 19 km northeast of Alexeyevskaya (the district's administrative centre) by road. Krasny Oktyabr is the nearest rural locality.

References 

Rural localities in Alexeyevsky District, Volgograd Oblast